Trioceros chapini, also known commonly as Chapin's chameleon, the gray chameleon, and the grey chameleon, is a species of lizard in the family Chamaeleonidae. The species is native to Central Africa.

Etymology
The specific name, chapini, is in honor of American ornithologist James Paul Chapin.

Geographic range
T. chapini is found in the Democratic Republic of the Congo and Gabon.

Habitat
The preferred natural habitat of T. chapini is forest.

Reproduction
The mode of reproduction of T. chapini is unknown.

References

Further reading
de Witte GF (1964). "A New Chameleon from the Congo". American Museum Novitates (2192): 1–3. (Chamaeleo chapini, new species).
Nečas P (1999). Chameleons—Nature's Hidden Jewels. Frankfurt am Main: Chimaira. 348 pp.  (Europe),  (United States, Canada). 
Tilbury CR, Tolley KA (2009). "A re-appraisal of the systematics of the African genus Chamaeleo (Reptilia: Chamaeleonidae)". Zootaxa 2079: 57–68.

Trioceros
Reptiles described in 1964
Taxa named by Gaston-François de Witte
Reptiles of Gabon
Reptiles of the Democratic Republic of the Congo